A Perfect Family is a 2012 Italian comedy film directed by Paolo Genovese. It is a remake of Fernando León de Aranoa's Familia.

Cast 
 Sergio Castellitto as Leone
 Claudia Gerini as Carmen
 Carolina Crescentini as Sole
 Marco Giallini as Fortunato
 Ilaria Occhini as Rosa
 Francesca Neri as Alicia

References

External links

2012 films
Italian remakes of foreign films
Remakes of Spanish films
Italian comedy films
2012 comedy films
Films directed by Paolo Genovese
2010s Italian-language films
2010s Italian films